Kravtsov (this family was a noble family Don Cossacks of a Polish origin. Owned the property in Bokovo-Platovo near Antratsyt. Anton Chekhov's first visit to the steppe was made in 1876 with the Kravtzoff family whose son - Pyotr Krawtzoff he tutored during his student days alone in Taganrog.

During the Civil war in Russia a lot of members including old people, women's and kids was killed by Bolsheviks and in 1920s by Soviets. Today most part of family lives in city of Melbourn in Australia, several countries of Europe and United States.

Notable family members 
 Petr G. Kravtsov, (1861—1919) was a Russian General during the First World War and a Don Cossack White movement General in the opening stages of Russian Civil War. He was killed by Bolsheviks in Battle for Tsaritsyn.  
 Alexey V. Kravtsov - (1879 – December 30, 1918), was the son of Yesaul Vladimir A. Kravtsov, hero of the Russo-Japanese War. Colonel of the Imperial Russian Army. He was a military commander and organizer of the 1st Cossack Volunteer Cavalry Regiment at the stanitsa Ust-Medveditskaya. He shot himself after he was wounded during the Battle of Loznoye from December 22 to December 30, 1918 where his regiment save by manoeuvre young Volunteer Army.

External links
 Shumkov, A.A., Ryklis, I.G. List of noble families of the Don Cossacks in alphabetical order. VIRD Publ House, Sankt-Peterburg. 2000,

References

Don Cossacks noble families
Russian noble families